The 2023 Liverpool City Council election will take place on 4 May 2023 to elect members of Liverpool City Council. Following a Boundary Review by The Local Government Boundary Commission for England, the size of the council was reduced from 90 to 85 seats with a change from three member seats, elected in thirds, three years out of every four, following the British Government instigated Best Value Inspection Report which led to the appointment by the government of Commissioners and the subsequent boundary review for Council Wards in Liverpool which the government initiated with the proviso that the number of councillors be reduced and the predominant number of wards be reduced to single members with all-up elections every four years.

Council composition
Before the election the composition of the council was:

[There was one vacancy following the resignation of Alison Clarke (Knotty Ash) on 22 November 2022.]

After the election the composition of the council was:

Retiring councillors (old wards)

Results Summary

Results

Aigburth

Allerton

Anfield

Arundel

Belle Vale

Broadgreen

Brownlow Hill

Calderstones

Canning

Childwall

Church

City Centre North

City Centre South

Clubmoor East

Clubmoor West

County

Croxteth

Croxteth Country Park

Dingle

Edge Hill

Everton East

Everton North

Everton West

Fazakerley East

Fazakerley North

Fazakerley West

Festival Gardens

Garston

Gateacre

Grassendale & Cressington

Greenbank Park

Kensington & Fairfield

Kirkdale East

Kirkdale West

Knotty Ash & Dovecot Park

Mossley Hill

Much Woolton & Hunts Cross

Norris Green

Old Swan East

Old Swan West

Orrell Park

Penny Lane

Princes Park

Sandfield Park

Sefton Park

Smithdown

Speke

Springwood

St. Michael's

Stoneycroft

Toxteth

Tuebrook Breckside Park

Tuebrook Larkhill

Vauxhall

Walton

Waterfront North

Waterfront South

Wavertree Garden Suburb

Wavertree Village

West Derby Deysbrook

West Derby Leyfield

West Derby Muirhead

Woolton Village

Yew Tree

By Elections

See also

 Liverpool City Council
 Liverpool Town Council elections 1835 - 1879
 Liverpool City Council elections 1880–present
 Mayors and Lord Mayors of Liverpool 1207 to present
 History of local government in England
 Elections in the United Kingdom

References

Liverpool City Region mayoral election
Elections in Merseyside
2020s in Liverpool